William Lane (died c. 1438), of Canterbury, Kent, was an English politician and vintner.

Family
Lane was the brother of Thomas Lane, MP. William married, before September 1393, a woman named Joan.

Career
Lane was a Member of Parliament for Canterbury in February 1413 and May 1421.

References

People from Canterbury
14th-century births
Year of birth missing
1438 deaths
English MPs February 1413
English MPs May 1421